Genod Droog (loosely means Bad Girls) were a Welsh hip hop, indie pop band from Wales, which was formed in 2005 by Carwyn Jones, Gethin Evans, Dylan Roberts, Aneirin Karadog and Ed Holden, and split up on 16 November 2008.

History
Genod Droog was born as a result of the desire of Ed Holden and Dylan Roberts to start performing live after Pep Le Pew, a successful Welsh language hip hop group, which split up in the winter of 2004.

Dylan Roberts, Gethin Evans and Carwyn Jones attended Ysgol Eifion Wyn and Ysgol Eifionydd Porthmadog and have been friends from an early age. Carwyn Jones was a DJ, DJing under the name DJ Kermit and DJ Kim De Bills to which he still now referred to within the band. Gethin Evans has played drums for a few groups the most successful would be Kentucky AFC until their split in 2007 and latterly Yucatan.  Ed Holden i
was a DJ, rapper, producer and beat boxer and knew Dylan through Coleg Menai in Bangor and had several side projects since they met in 1999, most notable Invisible Ninja Storm, Y Soffas and Pep Le Pew. Aneirin Karadog found Ed Holden through freestyle battles in Eisteddfod and subsequently joined the band having been in bands with Ed such as the Syn-D-Cut and Y Diwygiad (The Reformation)

Dylan Roberts or Dyl Mei, as he is known, is a producer from Porthmadog and has been awarded several BBC Radio Cymru C2 awards for best producers for albums such as Baccta Crackin by Texas Radio Band and 'Un tro yn y gorllewin' by Pep Le Pew. He also has recorded music from many other bands during his time at Blaen-y-Cae studio, Garndolbenmaen. Between the five of them they decided that there was a place within the Welsh music scene to make a band that was entertaining as well as musically original.

Their first gig was with Drymbago and MC Saizmundo at the Railway Club in Bangor and have since been gigging all over Wales with the a few exceptions of gigs in England. Most notable gig outside Wales was in the Barfly, London as part of the first BBC Electric Proms festivals, where the band worked with Gill Edwards and Ensemble Cymru on two songs.

An early recording of Breuddwyd Oer featuring Gwyneth Glyn on vocals appeared on Dan y Cownter 2 compilation in 2006.1

They went on to win best live and most popular band awards by the BBC Cymru C2 Rock and Pop (RAP) awards and were regarded as one of the best live bands in the Welsh language scene, because of their use of balloons, streamers and party atmosphere they produce during their live performances. Their biggest audience gig to date is a headlining the Sesiwn Fawr Dolgellau in 2007, held annually at Dolgellau.

The band were nominated as best live Welsh language act with Euros Childs, Sibrydion and Radio Luxembourg at the 2007 Pop Factory Awards, held at the Coal Exchange, Cardiff.

The album Ni oedd y Genod Droog was released on 4 August 2008. The album with a limited edition run that came with red filtered glasses, enabled the buyer to see hidden pictures on the cover. Ni oedd y Genod Droog was launched on 19 September 2008 at Porthmadog. Before the launch the band announced their intention to split after their performance at Huw Stephens's Sŵn Festival on 16 November 2008.

Band name
'Genod' means 'girls' in Welsh.
Droog is a corruption of the Welsh word "drwg" (bad), but also inspired by the droogs of A Clockwork Orange. The logo for the band was also inspired by the imagery in the film/book.

Awards
 2006 Nominated 'Best live Welsh band' at the Pop Factory Awards
 2007 Nominated 'Best live Welsh band' at the Pop Factory Awards
 2007 BBC Radio Cymru Gwobrau RAP / BBC Cymru RAP Awards - Best live band
 2007 BBC Radio Cymru Gwobrau RAP / BBC Cymru RAP Awards - Most popular band voted by the listeners

Discography
 2006 — Dan y Cownter 2 — Welsh language board compilation
 2008 - Ni Oedd y Genod Droog -  Slacyr Records

External links
Last.fm artist page, free music
Band video - Dal ni lawr
Band profile on BBC Wales website
Breuddwyd Oer Review

Welsh-language bands
Welsh hip hop groups
Welsh pop music groups
Welsh indie rock groups
Musical groups established in 2005